Document Z-3 (Italian:Documento Z-3) is a 1942 Italian spy film directed by Alfredo Guarini and starring Isa Miranda, Claudio Gora and Luis Hurtado. It was one of three Miranda films directed by Guarini that helped re-establish her in Italian cinema following her return from a largely unsuccessful spell in Hollywood. Many critics were not impressed with the film, feeling that Miranda had not recovered the spontaneity of her pre-Hollywood films. This is considered the first movie in which Federico Fellini has worked as a screenwriter.

Cast 
 Isa Miranda as Sandra Morini
 Claudio Gora as Paolo Sullich
 Luis Hurtado as Soviet Commissioner Petrov
 Guglielmo Barnabò as Kavelich
 Tina Lattanzi as La Semenov
 Amedeo Trilli as a Slavic official
 Carlo Tamberlani
 Aroldo Tieri
 Nicola Timofeiev

References

Bibliography 
 Gundle, Stephen. Mussolini's Dream Factory: Film Stardom in Fascist Italy. Berghahn Books, 2013.

External links 
 

1942 films
Italian spy films
Italian black-and-white films
1940s spy films
1940s Italian-language films
Films directed by Alfredo Guarini
1940s Italian films